Stergios Papachristos (born 26 January 1989 in Volos) is a Greek rower.

He competed at the 2012 Summer Olympics in the men's four.

He was part of the Greek four that won the 2011 European Championship with Ioannis Tsilis, Georgios Tziallas and Ioannis Christou.  This was the same team that won the silver medal at the 2011 World Championships.  He was also part of the Greek men's four that won the silver at the 2010 World Championships, with Tsilis, Nikolaos Gkountoulas and Apostolos Gkountoulas.  That team also won the silver at the 2010 European Championships.  In 2009, he won gold in the men's four at the European Championships with Tziallas, Ioannis Tsamis and Pavlos Gavrilidis.

References 

 

1989 births
Living people
Greek male rowers
Sportspeople from Volos
Rowers at the 2012 Summer Olympics
Olympic rowers of Greece
World Rowing Championships medalists for Greece
European Rowing Championships medalists